Christophe Diandy (born 25 November 1990) is a Senegalese professional footballer who plays as a left-back and left midfielder.

Career
Diandy began his career with AS Yego Dakar before spending two years with Liberty Professionals.

On 5 March 2009 he went on trial at Anderlecht, playing with the team at Torneo di Viareggio, and signed a contract six days later, on 11 March 2009.

International career
He played with the Senegal U-21 and is member of the extended squad from the A team.

Style of play 
Diandy is a versatile player, he plays in the offensive midfield or on the left wing.

References

External links
 
 

1990 births
Living people
Association football midfielders
Senegalese footballers
Senegal international footballers
R.S.C. Anderlecht players
Oud-Heverlee Leuven players
R. Charleroi S.C. players
R.A.E.C. Mons players
Royal Excel Mouscron players
Belgian Pro League players
Challenger Pro League players
Senegalese expatriate footballers
Expatriate footballers in Belgium
Senegalese expatriate sportspeople in Belgium